James Brady Callan is a former Roman Catholic priest and one of the founders of the Spiritus Christi Community in Rochester, New York.

Excommunication
Callan was removed from his post as administrator at Corpus Christi church in Rochester after a number of complaints were made to the Vatican about his church's policies of blessing same-sex unions, inviting non-Catholics to receive communion, having a pastoral associate, Mary Ramerman, dress and act like a priest, and other issues. The Bishop of Rochester, Matthew Clark, reassigned Callan to a community in Elmira, New York. Callan was excommunicated after he began to attend and preside over services at Spiritus Christi, then known as the New Faith community.

References

External links
 Find Articles
PBS
   Trinity College
Spiritus Christi Community

Year of birth missing (living people)
Living people
Religious leaders from Rochester, New York
People excommunicated by the Catholic Church